Canal Boulevard can refer to more than one roadway.

 Canal Boulevard, New Orleans in New Orleans, Louisiana
 Canal Boulevard, Port Richmond in Port Richmond, California
 New Jersey Route 129 in Trenton, New Jersey